Ladislao Dentice (1427–1476) was a Roman Catholic prelate who served as Bishop of Montemarano (1465–1476) and Bishop of Lucera (1450–1476).

Biography
Ladislao Dentice was born in 1427.
On 1 Jul 1450, he was appointed during the papacy of Pope Nicholas V as Bishop of Lucera.
On 7 Oct 1465, he was appointed during the papacy of Pope Paul II as Bishop of Montemarano.
He served as Bishop of Montemarano and Bishop of Lucera until his death in 1476.

References

External links and additional sources
 (for Chronology of Bishops)  
 (for Chronology of Bishops)  
 (for Chronology of Bishops) 
 (for Chronology of Bishops)  

15th-century Italian Roman Catholic bishops
Bishops appointed by Pope Nicholas V
Bishops appointed by Pope Paul II
1427 births
1476 deaths